"Pressure Sway" is a song recorded by the Australian synthpop band Machinations. It was released in April 1983 as the second and final single from the band's debut studio album, Esteem and peaked at number 21 on the Australian Kent Music Report.

Track listing
 7" Single (K 9074)
 Side A "Pressure Sway" - 3:53
 Side B "Pushbike" - 3:40

 12" Single (X 14030)
 Side A1 "Pressure Sway"  (Extended Version)  - 4:57
 Side B1 "Pressure Sway"  (Instrumental)  - 6:16
 Side B2 "Pushbike" - 3:40

Charts

References 

1983 songs
Machinations (band) songs
1983 singles
A&M Records singles
Mushroom Records singles